Kosmos 703 ( meaning Cosmos 703), also known as DS-P1-Yu No.70, was a Soviet satellite which was launched in 1975 as part of the Dnepropetrovsk Sputnik programme. It was a  spacecraft, which was built by the Yuzhnoye Design Bureau, and was used as a radar calibration target for anti-ballistic missile tests.

A Kosmos-2I 63SM carrier rocket was used to launch Kosmos 703 from Site 133/1 of the Plesetsk Cosmodrome. The launch occurred at 11:04:57 UTC on 21 January 1975, and resulted in the satellite successfully reaching low Earth orbit. Upon reaching orbit, the satellite was assigned its Kosmos designation, and received the International Designator 1975-003A. The North American Aerospace Defense Command assigned it the catalogue number 07611.

Kosmos 703 was the seventy-fourth of seventy nine DS-P1-Yu satellites to be launched, and the sixty-seventh of seventy two to successfully reach orbit. It remained in orbit until it decayed and reentered the atmosphere on 20 November 1975.

See also

1975 in spaceflight

References

1975 in spaceflight
Kosmos satellites
Spacecraft launched in 1975
Dnepropetrovsk Sputnik program